Worth is a village and civil parish in the Dover District of Kent, England, situated near Sandwich. It has two public houses, a church, and a school. According to the 2011 UK Census, Worth had a population of 992.

Worth was supposedly first inhabited due to its fertile soils. This then eventually led to the cultivation of the land during the Norman times by the Lords of the Eastry Manor.

History 

According to Hasted in the 18th century, Worth was made up of three boroughs, only one of which making up the current village of the 21st century, Worth Street. In the Gazetteer of the British Isles in 1887, John Bartholomew described Worth as coastal parish and village. During the sixteenth century, the area was known for its redbrick style of housing, however the parish church of St Peter & St Paul's, depicted on the left, shows the signs of Norman work from the twelfth century.

Name 
The parish name of Worth is said to relate to the word Enclosure, and incorporates a description of "elements and their meanings".

Literature 
C.S. Forester's fictional naval hero Horatio Hornblower was born in the village of Worth, according to Hornblower's biographer Cyril Northcote Parkinson in The Life and Times of Horatio Hornblower. According to Parkinson, the name of the small village varied in the 18th century from Word or Worde to Worth and that a farm called the Blue Pigeons was central to the smuggling business at that time. There is today a Blue Pigeon Inn in Worth.

It is said by a local legend that Henry V was returning on 25 October, also known as St Crispin's Day, where he had claimed victory at Agincourt, disembarking at Worth. Here he fell in love with a local "ale-wife", where they ended up living together at the local inn. supposedly as to why the Crispin Inn (pictured) of Worth is named as it is.

Location 
The two maps below depict the same mapped view of Worth, simply one century apart. As is clear by them, mapping technique and quality vastly improved over this period. Photography made mapping a lot more simple and a lot more accurate for Ordnance Survey.

Demographics

Population 
The village of Worth covers an area of 1629 hectares and with the population of 992, it has a population density of 0.61 people per hectare. In 1801, the village of Worth only had a population of 264 people, which rose to 718 come 1961. Population figures peaked to 977 as shown in the 1931 UK Census, however due to the unforeseeable circumstances of World War II, population plummeted and only in the most recent census has the population climbed above the 977 mark.

Employment 
As shown in the graphs to the right, female and male employment in history has been very different. In 2011 in Worth there were 414 people ages 16–74 in formal employment, with the majority of these being in wholesale and retail trade; and repair of motor vehicles (58), closely followed by those working in education (51). In 2011 Worth had 431 people listed as economically active, which left a total of 272 economically inactive. Despite this only 18 are listed as 'unemployed', as the majority of those who are economically inactive are either retired, students, on long term sick leave, disabled or are carers for other family members.

Housing 
Within Worth there are 403 households, the majority of these have either 1 or 2 occupants, 106 and 183 respectively.

Social 
In 2011, out of the population of Worth, the most common religion is that of Christianity, with 651 Christians, compared to the next highest belief, being no religious views, encompassing 225 people. This is a trend for both which follows the trends of the whole district of Dover. Health in the area is high, with only 82 people out of 992 being in bad or very bad health in the 2011 UK Census. Of the 992 people living in Worth, according to the 2011 Census, 950 of these were born in the United Kingdom.

References

External links 

Market towns in Kent